Samuel Morris Brown also known as Pete Brown (December 19, 1930 – September 4, 2001) was an American football linebacker and center who played for the San Francisco 49ers. He played college football for the Georgia Tech football team.

Early life 
A native of Rossville, Georgia, Brown graduated from Rossville High School in Rossville, Georgia.

Career

College football 
Brown was a member of two teams that went undefeated while he was at Georgia Tech
- 1951 team that finished 11-0-1
- 1952 team that finished 12-0 sharing the national championship with Michigan State

"He was the greatest blocker I ever saw," said Edwin Pope, former Atlanta Constitution sports writer and sports editor of the Miami Herald.

NFL 
Drafted by the 49ers in 1953, Brown's NFL career was cut short due to a shoulder injury.

Military service 
Brown served as a lieutenant colonel in the Air Force Reserve Command.

Awards and recognition
SEC All Southeastern Conference, 1951
NCAA All-American, Football, 1952
NCAA National Championship Team Member, 1952 
Georgia Tech Athletic Hall of Fame inductee, 1974
Georgia Sports Hall of Fame inductee, 1990

References

2001 deaths
1930 births
People from Rossville, Georgia
American football centers
American football linebackers
Georgia Tech Yellow Jackets football players
San Francisco 49ers players